Oregon State University Press, or OSU Press, founded in 1961, is a university press that publishes roughly 15 titles per year and is part of Oregon State University. The only academic publisher in Oregon, the press produces works related to the Pacific Northwest, particularly the history, natural history, cultures, and literature of the region or environmental history and natural resource issues.

Since June 1, 2005 OSU Press has distributed the books published by University of Oregon Press.

See also

 List of English-language book publishing companies
 List of university presses

References

External links
Oregon State University Press
 Oregon State University Press Oral History Interview

Press
University presses of the United States
University and college mass media in Oregon
Publishing companies established in 1961
Book publishing companies based in Oregon
1961 establishments in Oregon